Camille Curti (born 14 April 1999) is a French female acrobatic gymnast. With partner Alexis Martin, Curti achieved 7th at the 2014 Acrobatic Gymnastics World Championships.

References

1999 births
Living people
French children
French acrobatic gymnasts
Female acrobatic gymnasts
21st-century French women